Bidens cernua is a species of flowering plant in the aster family, Asteraceae. Bidens cernua is distributed throughout much of Eurasia and North America. It is commonly called nodding beggarticks or nodding bur-marigold.

Distribution and abundance 
Bidens cernua is distributed throughout much of Eurasia and North America.

Morphology

General description 
Bidens cernua is an annual species growing roughly 1m tall, with a fibrous root. Stems are rigid and often either simple or beached. Stem leaves are simple, unstalked, and opposite.

References

cernua
Flora of Asia
Flora of North America
Flora of Europe
Plants described in 1753
Taxa named by Carl Linnaeus